Siege at Red River is a 1954 American Western film directed by Rudolph Maté and written by Sydney Boehm. The film stars Van Johnson, Joanne Dru, Richard Boone, Milburn Stone, Jeff Morrow, and Craig Hill. The film was released on May 1, 1954, by 20th Century Fox.

Plot

In Ohio in 1865, a Gatling gun is being transported by a Confederate Army officer in civilian clothes, calling himself Jim Farraday, and a sergeant, going by Benjy, to aid the Southern cause in the war.  They come to the aid of a Rebel-hating Yankee nurse, Nora Curtis, whose wagon is stuck in the mud.

Stopping off in a town for supplies and information, Farraday falls under the suspicion of a Pinkerton detective, Frank Kelso, who has been assigned to locate the stolen Gatling gun.  Behind her back, Farraday and Benjy smuggle the gun out of town in Nora's wagon.

A mercenary, Brett Manning, befriends the soldiers on the trail, then betrays them, shooting Benjy and stealing the gun. He sells it to tribal leader Chief Yellow Hawk, who uses it during an attack on a fort against soldiers, women and children. Farraday joins forces with Kelso to overcome Yellow Hawk's men and take the gun back, turning the battle in the fort's favor. Nora successfully argues that Kelso should reward Farraday by letting him go home to Georgia. Knowing that the war is nearly over, he allows Farraday to leave.

Cast 
Van Johnson as Capt. James S. Simmons / Jim Farraday
Joanne Dru as Nora Curtis
Richard Boone as Brett Manning
Craig Hill as Lt. Braden
Milburn Stone as Sgt. Benjamin 'Benjy' Guderman
John Cliff as Sgt. Jenkins
Jeff Morrow as Frank Kelso
Rico Alaniz as Chief Yellow Hawk
Robert Burton as Sheriff
Pilar Del Rey as Lukoa
Ferris Taylor as Anderson Smith

Production
Parts of the film were shot in Professor Valley, Colorado River, Castle Valley and Dead Horse Point in Utah, as well as in Durango, Colorado.

References

External links 
 

1954 films
20th Century Fox films
American Western (genre) films
1954 Western (genre) films
Films directed by Rudolph Maté
Films scored by Lionel Newman
Films shot in Utah
Films shot in Colorado
1950s English-language films
1950s American films